Meghalaya Cricket Association is the governing body of the cricket activities in the Meghalaya state of India and the Meghalaya cricket team. It is affiliated to the Board of Control for Cricket in India as Full Member. Shri Danny Marak is the head of the association while Shri Gideon Kharkongor is the new Honorary Secretary
.

Cricket is still in its infancy in Meghalaya as the lack of a proper cricket stadium in the state has upset the State cricket association for long.

Although the Board of Cricket Control in India is ready to invest crores of rupees to build up stadium in Meghalaya, the State cricket association is still helpless, thanks to the casual attitude of the state government.

References

Cricket administration in India
Cricket in Meghalaya
Year of establishment missing